Alexa von Tobel (born October 6, 1983) is the founder and CEO of LearnVest.com, a personal finance website, and the founder and Managing Partner of Inspired Capital. Von Tobel is the author of the New York Times bestseller Financially Fearless, which debuted on December 31, 2013, and the author of Financially Forward, which debuted on May 14, 2019. In April 2014, von Tobel was selected as an inaugural member of the Presidential Ambassadors for Global Entrepreneurship, alongside Steve Case, Reid Hoffman, Tory Burch and others. Von Tobel is the host of Inc.'s The Founders Project with Alexa von Tobel podcast.

Early life, education and family
Von Tobel is from Jacksonville, Florida. Her mother, a nurse practitioner, Darlene Marie von Tobel and her father the late Dr. Harry M. Von Tobel, worked in a private practice specializing as a developmental pediatrician.Von Tobel received a B.A. in Psychology at Harvard College. Alexa von Tobel is married to Michael Ryan Jr., they both met at Harvard. The couple has 3 children, born in 2015, 2018 and 2019.

Career
After graduation, she worked as a trader at Morgan Stanley before leaving to be the Head of Business Development at Drop.io, which was acquired by Facebook.

Von Tobel came up with the idea for LearnVest in 2006 while working at Morgan Stanley when she realized she and most other people had never had any formal education about how to manage their personal finances. In April 2009, Von Tobel closed a $4.5 million series A round of funding led by Accel Partners. Learnvest raised a total of $72 million whilst a private company, from investors including Accel Partners, American Express Ventures and Northwestern Mutual Capital.

On March 25, 2015, Northwestern Mutual Life Insurance Co., based in Milwaukee, announced it would acquire LearnVest for a reported price of $375 million. LearnVest continued to operate as a separate unit under founder and Chief Executive von Tobel.

In 2019, Von Tobel launched a new early stage venture capital fund, Inspired Capital, along with Penny Pritzker.  Inspired Capital's first fund was $200M.

Awards and recognition
Von Tobel has been included in lists like Business Insider's 2010 "Silicon Alley 100," Inc. Magazine's "30 under 30: The Top Young Entrepreneurs of 2010," “Women to Watch” by Forbes, “18 Women Changing the World” in Marie Claire, and BusinessWeek's annual list of “Best Young Tech Entrepreneurs.” In 2012, she was selected as a Fortune "Most Powerful Women Entrepreneur" and named a scholar at the Aspen Ideas Festival.

Von Tobel has been a featured speaker at several conferences and events such as the 2012 SXSW Interactive,
TEDxWallStreet Event at NYSE,
Stern Entrepreneurs Exchange Summit 2012,
Ruth's Chris Steak House and Marie Claire Celebrate Female Entrepreneurs: Women in Business Speaker Series,
Fortune Summit: Most Powerful Women Entrepreneurs,
The George Washington University 5th Annual Women in Business Conference,
and Inc.’s GrowCo Conference in 2013.

Von Tobel hosted the first live event for the website, LearnVest LIVE, in October 2012, featuring lectures by fashion designer Cynthia Rowley, Top Chef judge Gail Simmons, Marie Claire editor and Project Runway mentor Joanna Coles, Gilt Groupe cofounder Alexandra Wilkis Wilson, and one of LearnVest's CFP professionals and their Director of Financial Planning, Stephany Kirkpatrick.

In her spare time, Von Tobel enjoys interior design.

References 

1984 births
Living people
Harvard College alumni
People from Florida
American women chief executives
American technology chief executives
American chief executives of financial services companies
Henry Crown Fellows
21st-century American women